The 2018–19 UEFA Europa League was the 48th season of Europe's secondary club football tournament organised by UEFA, and the 10th season since it was renamed from the UEFA Cup to the UEFA Europa League.

The final was played at the Olympic Stadium in Baku, Azerbaijan, between English sides Chelsea and Arsenal – which was the first Europa League final to feature two teams from one city. Chelsea defeated Arsenal 4–1 and earned the right to play against Liverpool, the winners of the 2018–19 UEFA Champions League, in the 2019 UEFA Super Cup. As winners, Chelsea would also have been qualified for the 2019–20 UEFA Champions League group stage; however, since they had already qualified after finishing third in the Premier League, the berth reserved was given to the third-placed team of the 2018–19 Ligue 1 (Lyon) – the 5th-ranked association according to next season's access list.

For the first time, the video assistant referee (VAR) system was used in the competition, where it was implemented in the final.

As the title holders of the Europa League, Atlético Madrid qualified for the 2018–19 UEFA Champions League, although they had already qualified before the final through their league performance. They were unable to defend their title as they advanced to the Champions League knockout stage, and were eliminated by Juventus in the round of 16.

Format changes
On 9 December 2016, UEFA confirmed the reforming plan for the UEFA Champions League for the 2018–2021 cycle, which was announced on 26 August 2016. As per the new regulations, all teams that are eliminated in the UEFA Champions League qualifying rounds will get a second chance in the Europa League.

Association team allocation
213 teams from all 55 UEFA member associations participated in the 2018–19 UEFA Europa League. The association ranking based on the UEFA country coefficients was used to determine the number of participating teams for each association:
Associations 1–51 (except Liechtenstein) each had three teams qualify.
Associations 52–54 each had two teams qualify.
Liechtenstein and Kosovo (association 55) each had one team qualify (Liechtenstein organised only a domestic cup and no domestic league; Kosovo as per decision by the UEFA Executive Committee).
Moreover, 55 teams eliminated from the 2018–19 UEFA Champions League were transferred to the Europa League (default number was 57, but 2 fewer teams competed in the 2018–19 UEFA Champions League).

Association ranking
For the 2018–19 UEFA Europa League, the associations were allocated places according to their 2017 UEFA country coefficients, which took into account their performance in European competitions from 2012–13 to 2016–17.

Apart from the allocation based on the country coefficients, associations could have additional teams participating in the Champions League, as noted below:
 – Additional teams transferred from the UEFA Champions League

Distribution
In the default access list, originally 17 losers from the Champions League first qualifying round were transferred to the Europa League second qualifying round (Champions Path). However, one fewer loser would be transferred since the Champions League title holders already qualified for the group stage via their domestic league. Therefore, only 19 teams entered the Champions Path second qualifying round (one of the losers from the Champions League first qualifying round would be drawn to receive a bye to the third qualifying round).

In addition, originally three losers from the Champions League second qualifying round (League Path) were transferred to the Europa League third qualifying round (Main Path). However, one fewer loser would be transferred since the Europa League title holders already qualified for the group stage via their domestic league. As a result, the following changes to the access list was made:
The cup winners of association 18 (Denmark) entered the third qualifying round instead of the second qualifying round.
The cup winners of association 25 (Norway) entered the second qualifying round instead of the first qualifying round.
The cup winners of associations 50 (Wales) and 51 (Faroe Islands) entered the first qualifying round instead of the preliminary round.

Redistribution rules
A Europa League place was vacated when a team qualified for both the Champions League and the Europa League, or qualified for the Europa League by more than one method. When a place was vacated, it was redistributed within the national association by the following rules:
When the domestic cup winners (considered as the "highest-placed" qualifier within the national association with the latest starting round) also qualified for the Champions League, their Europa League place was vacated. As a result, the highest-placed team in the league which had not yet qualified for European competitions qualified for the Europa League, with the Europa League qualifiers which finished above them in the league moving up one "place".
When the domestic cup winners also qualified for the Europa League through league position, their place through the league position was vacated. As a result, the highest-placed team in the league which had not yet qualified for European competitions qualified for the Europa League, with the Europa League qualifiers which finished above them in the league moving up one "place" if possible.
For associations where a Europa League place was reserved for either the League Cup or end-of-season European competition play-offs winners, they always qualified for the Europa League as the "lowest-placed" qualifier. If the League Cup winners had already qualified for European competitions through other methods, this reserved Europa League place was taken by the highest-placed team in the league which had not yet qualified for European competitions.

Teams
The labels in the parentheses show how each team qualified for the place of its starting round:
CW: Cup winners
2nd, 3rd, 4th, 5th, 6th, etc.: League position
LC: League Cup winners
RW: Regular season winners
PW: End-of-season Europa League play-offs winners
UCL: Transferred from the Champions League
GS: Third-placed teams from the group stage
PO: Losers from the play-off round
Q3: Losers from the third qualifying round
Q2: Losers from the second qualifying round
Q1: Losers from the first qualifying round
PR: Losers from the preliminary round (SF: semi-finals; F: final)

Notably one team that was not playing a national top division took part in the competition; Vaduz (representing Liechtenstein) played in 2017–18 Swiss Challenge League, which is Switzerland's second tier.

Notes

Round and draw dates
The schedule of the competition was as follows (all draws were held at the UEFA headquarters in Nyon, Switzerland, unless stated otherwise).

Matches in the qualifying (including preliminary and play-off) and knockout rounds could also be played on Tuesdays or Wednesdays instead of the regular Thursdays due to scheduling conflicts.

From this season, the kick-off times starting from the group stage were slightly changed to 18:55 CET and 21:00 CET. Kick-off times starting from the quarter-finals were 21:00 CEST.

Qualifying rounds

In the qualifying and play-off rounds, teams are divided into seeded and unseeded teams based on their 2018 UEFA club coefficients (for Main Path), or based on which round they qualified from (for Champions Path), and then drawn into two-legged home-and-away ties.

Preliminary round
In the preliminary round, teams were divided into seeded and unseeded teams based on their 2018 UEFA club coefficients, and then drawn into two-legged home-and-away ties. Teams from the same association could not be drawn against each other. The draw for the preliminary round was held on 12 June 2018. The first legs were played on 26 and 28 June, and the second legs were played on 5 July 2018.

First qualifying round
The draw for the first qualifying round was held on 20 June 2018. The first legs were played on 10, 11 and 12 July, and the second legs were played on 17, 18 and 19 July 2018.

Second qualifying round
The second qualifying round is split into two separate sections: Champions Path (for league champions) and Main Path (for cup winners and league non-champions). The draw for the second qualifying round (Champions Path) was held on 19 June, and the draw for the second qualifying round (Main Path) was held on 20 June 2018. The first legs were played on 26 July, and the second legs were played on 31 July, 1 and 2 August 2018.

Third qualifying round
The third qualifying round is split into two separate sections: Champions Path (for league champions) and Main Path (for cup winners and league non-champions). The draw for the third qualifying round was held on 23 July 2018. The first legs were played on 7 and 9 August, and the second legs were played on 16 August 2018.

Play-off round

The play-off round is split into two separate sections: Champions Path (for league champions) and Main Path (for cup winners and league non-champions). The draw for the play-off round was held on 6 August 2018. The first legs were played on 23 August, and the second legs were played on 30 August 2018.

Group stage

The draw for the group stage was held on 31 August 2018 at the Grimaldi Forum in Monaco. The 48 teams were drawn into twelve groups of four, with the restriction that teams from the same association cannot be drawn against each other. For the draw, the teams are seeded into four pots based on their 2018 UEFA club coefficients.

In each group, teams played against each other home-and-away in a round-robin format. The group winners and runners-up advance to the round of 32 where they are joined by the eight third-placed teams of the 2018–19 UEFA Champions League group stage. The matchdays are 20 September, 4 October, 25 October, 8 November, 29 November, and 13 December 2018.

A total of 27 national associations were represented in the group stage. Akhisarspor, Chelsea, F91 Dudelange, Jablonec, Rangers, RB Leipzig, Sarpsborg 08, Spartak Moscow and Spartak Trnava made their debut appearances in the UEFA Europa League group stage (although Chelsea, Rangers, RB Leipzig and Spartak Moscow had already competed in the UEFA Europa League knockout phase after a third place in the UEFA Champions League group stage, while Rangers and Spartak Moscow had appeared in the UEFA Cup group stage). Akhisarspor and Sarpsborg 08 made their debuts in any European football. F91 Dudelange were the first team from Luxembourg to play in either the Champions League or Europa League group stage.

Group A

Group B

Group C

Group D

Group E

Group F

Group G

Group H

Group I

Group J

Group K

Group L

Knockout phase

In the knockout phase, teams play against each other over two legs on a home-and-away basis, except for the one-match final.

Bracket

Round of 32
The draw for the round of 32 was held on 17 December 2018. The first legs were played on 12 and 14 February, and the second legs were played on 20 and 21 February 2019.

Round of 16
The draw for the round of 16 was held on 22 February 2019. The first legs were played on 7 March, and the second legs were played on 14 March 2019.

Quarter-finals
The draw for the quarter-finals was held on 15 March 2019. The first legs were played on 11 April, the second legs were played on 18 April 2019.

Semi-finals
The draw for the semi-finals was held on 15 March 2019 (after the quarter-final draw). The first legs were played on 2 May, and the second legs were played on 9 May 2019.

Final

The final was held on 29 May 2019 at the Olympic Stadium in Baku. The "home" team (for administrative purposes) was determined by an additional draw held after the quarter-final and semi-final draws.

Statistics
Statistics exclude qualifying rounds and play-off round.

Top goalscorers

Top assists

Squad of the season
The UEFA technical study group selected the following 18 players as the squad of the tournament.

Player of the season
Votes were cast by coaches of the 48 teams in the group stage, together with 55 journalists selected by the European Sports Media (ESM) group, representing each of UEFA's member associations. The coaches were not allowed to vote for players from their own teams. Jury members selected their top three players, with the first receiving five points, the second three and the third one. The shortlist of the top three players was announced on 8 August 2019. The award winner was announced during the 2019–20 UEFA Europa League group stage draw in Monaco on 30 August 2019.

See also
2018–19 UEFA Champions League
2019 UEFA Super Cup

References

External links

 
2
2018-19